Chlormidazole (INN, also known as clomidazole) is used as a spasmolytic and azole antifungal drug.

Synthesis

See also
 Clemizole

References 

 Merck Index, 12th Edition, 2156.

Antifungals
Benzimidazoles
Chlorobenzenes
Lanosterol 14α-demethylase inhibitors